This is a list of notable opera houses listed by continent, then by country with the name of the opera house and city. The opera company is sometimes named for clarity.

Africa

Egypt 

 Alexandria Opera House, Alexandria
 Cairo Opera House, Cairo
 Damanhur Opera House, Damanhur
 Khedivial Opera House, Cairo (burnt in 1971)
 Port Said Opera House, Port Said

South Africa 

 Artscape Opera House (Cape Town Opera Company), Cape Town
 Pretoria State Theatre

Tunisia 
 Théâtre municipal de Tunis
Tunisia's City of Culture

Morocco 
 Théâtre National Mohammed V, Rabat
 Grand National Theatre of Rabat
 Grand Théâtre CasArts, Casablanca
 Gran Teatro Cervantes, Tangier
 Théâtre Municipal de Casablanca
 Théâtre Afifi, El-Jadida
 Royal Opera House of Marrakech
 Rialto, Casablanca
 Théâtre Regent, Meknès
 Théâtre Med VI, Oujda

Asia

Armenia 
 Yerevan Opera Theatre, Yerevan

Azerbaijan 
 Azerbaijan State Academic Opera and Ballet Theater, Baku

Bangladesh 
 Hatirjheel Opera House, Dhaka

China 

 Century Theatre, Beijing
 National Centre for the Performing Arts
 Poly Theatre, Beijing
 Zhengyici-xi-lou, Beijing Opera, Beijing
 Poly Theatre (People's Liberation Army Opera House), Beijing
 Guangzhou Beilei Theatre
 Guangzhou Drama Arts Center – Theatre No.13
 Guangzhou Friendship Theatre
 Guangzhou Guanglian Hall
 Guangzhou Huanghuagang Theatre
 Guangzhou Jiangnan Theatre
 Guangzhou Military Auditorium
 Guangzhou Opera House
 Guangzhou Rainbow Theatre
 Guangzhou South Theatre
 Hangzhou Grand Theatre, Hangzhou
 Harbin Grand Theatre
 Shanghai Grand Theatre, Shanghai
 Shanghai Opera Theater, Shanghai
 Oriental Opera Hall at the Shanghai Oriental Art Center, Shanghai
 Shanghai Yue Opera House, Shanghai
 Tianchan Theatre, Shanghai

Hong Kong 
 Ko Shan Theatre Theatre, Hong Kong
 Ngau Chi Wan Civic Centre Theatre, Hong Kong
 North District Town Hall Auditorium, Hong Kong
 Sai Wab Ho Civic Centre Theatre, Hong Kong
 Shatin Town Hall Auditorium, Hong Kong
 Sheungwan Civic Centre Theatre, Hong Kong
 Sunbeam Theatre, Hong Kong
 Taipo Civic Centre Auditorium, Hong Kong
 Tsuen Wan Town Hall Auditorium, Hong Kong
 Tuen Mun Town Hall Auditorium, Hong Kong

India 
 Royal Opera House (Mumbai)
 Jamshed Bhabha Theatre (Mumbai)
 Samsung Opera House, Bangalore A previous opera venue. now restored/adapted by Samsumg as an "Experience Centre"

Indonesia 

 Aula Simfonia Jakarta, Jakarta
 Jakarta Art Building, Jakarta
 Taman Ismail Marzuki Theater Hall, Jakarta
 Usmar Ismail Concert Hall, Jakarta

Iran 
 Vahdat Hall

Israel 
 Tel Aviv Performing Arts Center

Japan 

 Aichi Arts Centre, Nagoya
 Biwako Hall, Ōtsu, Shiga
 Bunkamura Orchard Hall, Tokyo
 Kanagawa Kenmin Hall, Yokohama
 New National Theatre, Tokyo (NNTT)
 NHK Hall, Tokyo
 Tokyo Bunka Kaikan, Tokyo
 Yokosuka Arts Theatre, Yokosuka

Kazakhstan 

 ABAI Kazakh State Academic Opera and Ballet Theatre, Almaty (1934)
 Baiseitova Kazakh National Opera and Ballet Theatre, Astana (2000–2012, terminated)
 Palace of Peace and Reconciliation – Opera Hall, Astana (2006)
 Shymkent Regional Opera and Ballet Theatre, Shymkent (2007)
 State Opera and Ballet Theatre, "Astana opera", Astana (2012)

Kuwait 

Kuwait Opera House, Kuwait City

Malaysia 
 Palace of Culture, Kuala Lumpur
 Permaisuri Zarith Sofiah Opera House, Johor Bahru

Mongolia 
 National Academic Theatre of Opera and Ballet of Mongolia, Ulaanbaatar

Oman 
 Royal Opera House, Muscat

Philippines 

 Cultural Center of the Philippines, Manila
 Manila Grand Opera House – historic theatre, now demolished

Singapore 

 Esplanade – Theatres on the Bay, Singapore
 Victoria Theatre & Concert Hall, Singapore

Syria 
 Damascus Opera House

South Korea 

 Daegu Opera House, Daegu
 National Theater of Korea, Seoul
 Seoul Arts Center Opera House, Seoul
 Seongnam Arts Center Opera House, Seongnam

Taiwan 

 National Taichung Theater
 National Theater and Concert Hall, Taipei

Tajikistan 
 Aini Theater of Opera and Ballet, Dushanbe

Thailand 
 Thailand Cultural Centre, Bangkok

Turkey 

 Ankara Opera House, Ankara
 Atatürk Cultural Center, Taksim, İstanbul
 Antalya State Opera and Ballet, Antalya
 City Opera, Eskisehir Metropolitan Municipality, Eskişehir
 İzmir State Opera and Ballet, Elhamra Palace, İzmir
 Leyla Gencer Sahnesi, Ankara
 Mersin Halkevi (Mersin State Opera and Ballet), Mersin
 Operet Sahnesi, Ankara
 Süreyya Opera House, Kadıköy, İstanbul

United Arab Emirates 
 Dubai Opera, Dubai

Uzbekistan 
 Navoi Theatre, Tashkent

Vietnam 

 Haiphong Opera House, Haiphong
 Hanoi Opera House, Hanoi
 Municipal Theatre, Ho Chi Minh City (Saigon Opera House), Ho Chi Minh City

Europe

Albania 
 Tirana Opera House, Tirana, Albania

Austria 

 Bregenzer Festspiele, Bregenz
 Stadtheater Baden, Baden bei Wien
 Graz Opera, Graz
 Musiktheater Linz, Linz
 Neue Oper Wien, Vienna
 Salzburg Festival, Salzburg
 Salzburger Landestheater, Salzburg
 Schlosstheater Schönbrunn, Vienna
 Theater an der Wien, Vienna; historic theatre associated with Mozart's time
 Theater Klagenfurt, Klagenfurt
 Volksoper Wien (Vienna People's Opera), Vienna
 Wiener Kammeroper (Vienna Chamber Opera), Vienna
 Wiener Staatsoper (Vienna State Opera), Vienna

Belarus 
 National Opera and Ballet of Belarus, Minsk

Belgium 

 La Monnaie/De Munt (Royal Theatre of the Mint), Brussels
 Opéra Royal de Wallonie, Liège
 Vlaamse Opera, Antwerp
 Vlaamse Opera, Ghent

Bosnia and Herzegovina 
 National Theatre Opera and Ballet, Sarajevo

Bulgaria 

 Bourgas Opera Theatre, Bourgas
 National Opera and Ballet, Sofia
 Rousse State Opera, Rousse
 State Opera Plovdiv, Plovdiv
 State Opera Stara Zagora, Stara Zagora
 Varna Opera Theatre, Varna

Croatia 

 Croatian National Theatre, Osijek
 Ivan Zajc Croatian National Theatre, Rijeka
 Croatian National Theatre, Split
 Croatian National Theatre, Varaždin
 Croatian National Theatre in Zagreb, Zagreb
 Croatian National Theatre, Zadar

Czech Republic 

 National Theatre (Prague) (Národní Divadlo), Prague
 The State Opera (Státní opera), Prague
 Theatre of the Estates (Stavovské divadlo or Estates Theatre), Prague

Denmark 

 The Copenhagen Opera House (Operaen), Copenhagen
 Den Jyske Opera, Aarhus
 Det Kongelige Teater (Royal Danish Theatre), Copenhagen
 Funen Opera, Odense
 Opera Hedeland, Hedehusene

Estonia 
 Estonian National Opera, Tallinn
 Vanemuine, Tartu

Finland 

 Finnish National Opera and Ballet, Helsinki

France 

 Grand Théâtre, Angers
 Opéra-théâtre d'Avignon, Avignon
 Opéra Théâtre de Besançon, Besançon
 Grand Théâtre, Bordeaux
 Auditorium de Dijon, Dijon (Opéra de Dijon)
 Grand Théâtre, Dijon (Opéra de Dijon)
 Opéra de Lille, Lille
 Opéra Théâtre de Limoges, Limoges
 Nouvel Opéra, Lyon
 Opéra de Marseille, Marseille
 Opéra-Théâtre de Metz, Metz
 Opéra et Orchestre National de Montpellier Languedoc-Roussillon, Montpellier
 Opéra national de Lorraine, Nancy
 Théâtre Graslin, Nantes
 Opéra de Nice, Nice
 Opéra Bastille, Paris
 Opéra Comique, Paris
 Palais Garnier, Paris
 Théâtre du Châtelet, Paris
 Reims Opera House, Reims
 Opéra de Rennes, Rennes
 Opéra de Rouen, Rouen
 Opéra de Saint-Étienne, Saint-Étienne
 Opéra national du Rhin, Strasbourg
 Opéra de Toulon, Toulon
 Théâtre du Capitole, Toulouse
 Opéra de Tours, Tours
 Royal Opera of Versailles, Versailles

Germany 

 Aalto Theatre, Essen
 Alte Oper (former opera house), Frankfurt
 Anhaltisches Theater, Dessau
 Badisches Staatstheater Karlsruhe, Karlsruhe
 Bayreuth Festspielhaus (Bayreuth Festival Theatre), Bayreuth
 Cologne Opera, Cologne
 Cuvilliés Theatre, Munich
 Deutsche Oper am Rhein (German Opera of the Rhine), Düsseldorf
 Deutsche Oper Berlin (Berlin German Opera), Berlin
 Deutsches Nationaltheater Weimar, Weimar
 Dortmund Opera, Dortmund
 Elbe Philharmonic Hall, Hamburg
 Festspielhaus Baden-Baden (Baden-Baden Festival Theatre), Baden-Baden
 Halle Opera House, Halle
 Hamburgische Staatsoper (Hamburg State Opera), Hamburg
 Hessisches Staatstheater Wiesbaden, Wiesbaden
 Opernhaus Kiel, Kiel
 Komische Oper Berlin, Berlin
 Kroll Opera House, Berlin (destroyed in 1943)
 Landestheater Altenburg 
 Markgräfliches Opernhaus, Bayreuth
 Mecklenburg State Theatre, Schwerin
 Das Meininger Theater, Meiningen
 Musiktheater im Revier, Gelsenkirchen
 National Theatre Munich (Bavarian State Opera), Munich
 Nationaltheater Mannheim, Mannheim
 Oldenburgisches Staatstheater, Oldenburg (Lower Saxony)
 Oper am Gänsemarkt, Hamburg
 Oper Frankfurt (Frankfurt Opera), Frankfurt
 Oper Leipzig (Leipzig Opera), Leipzig
 Opernhaus am Taschenberg, Dresden (changed to church in 1708, demolished in 1888)
 Opernhaus am Zwinger, Dresden (1719, destroyed 1849)
 Opernhaus Dortmund, Dortmund
 Opernhaus Düsseldorf, Düsseldorf
 Opernhaus Wuppertal, Wuppertal
 Prinzregententheater, Munich
 Saarländisches Staatstheater, Saarbrücken
 Schlosstheater Schwetzingen, Schwetzingen
 Semperoper (Saxon State Opera), Dresden
 Staatsoper Hannover, Hanover
 Staatsoper Unter den Linden (Berlin State Opera), Berlin
 Staatstheater am Gärtnerplatz, Munich
 Staatstheater Braunschweig, Braunschweig
 Staatstheater Darmstadt, Darmstadt
 Staatstheater Kassel, Kassel
 Staatstheater Mainz, Mainz
 Staatstheater Nürnberg, Nuremberg
 Staatstheater Stuttgart, Stuttgart
 Stadttheater Minden, Minden
 Theater Bonn, Bonn
 Theater Bremen, Bremen
 Theater Chemnitz, Chemnitz
 Theater Duisburg, Duisburg
 Theater Erfurt, Erfurt
 Theater Heidelberg, Heidelberg
 Theater Lübeck, Lübeck
 Theater Münster, Münster
 Theater Trier, Trier
 Theater Ulm, Ulm

Greece 

 Stavros Niarchos Foundation Cultural Center, Greek National Opera, Athens
 Athens Concert Hall, Athens
 Thessaloniki Concert Hall, Thessaloniki
 Apollon Theatre (Patras), Patras
 Apollon Theatre (in Greek), Ermoupolis

Georgia 

 Georgian National Opera Theater, Tbilisi
 Kutaisi State Opera, Kutaisi

Hungary 

 Budapest Operetta Theatre (Budapesti Operettszínház), Budapest
 Erkel Theatre (Erkel Színház), Budapest
 Hungarian State Opera House (Magyar Állami Operaház), Budapest

Iceland 
 The Icelandic Opera (Íslenska Óperan), Reykjavík

Ireland 

 Cork Opera House, Cork
 Theatre Royal, Wexford
 Wexford Opera House

Italy 

 Arena di Verona, Verona
 Opera di Firenze, Florence
 Sferisterio, Macerata
 Teatro Alessandro Bonci, Cesena
 Teatro Alfieri, Asti
 Teatro Alfieri, Florence
 Teatro Alfieri, Turin
 Teatro alla Scala, Milan
 Teatro Apollo, Lecce
 Teatro Argentina, Rome
 Teatro Augusteo, Naples
 Teatro Bellini, Naples
 Teatro Capranica, Rome
 Teatro Carignano, Turin
 Teatro Carlo Felice, Genoa
 Teatro Civico, Sassari
 Teatro Civico, Tortona
 Teatro Coccia, Novara
 Teatro Comunale, Alessandria
 Teatro Comunale, Bologna
 Teatro Comunale, Ferrara
 Teatro Comunale, Florence, cast off in 2014 (and later dismantled)and substituted by the newly built 
 Teatro Comunale, Modena
 Teatro Comunale Alighieri, Ravenna
 Teatro Comunale Carlo Gesualdo, Avellino
 Teatro Communale G. B. Pergolesi, Jesi
 Teatro Comunale Gabriello Chiabrera, Savona
 Teatro Communale Ponchielli, Cremona
 Teatro Comunale Umberto Giordano, Foggia
 Teatro Comunale Vittorio Emanuele, Benevento
 Teatro Curci, Barletta
 Teatro dell'Opera di Roma, Rome
 Teatro degli Arcimboldi, Milan
 Teatro della Gran Guardia, Livorno
 Teatro della Pergola, Florence
 Teatro delle Muse, Ancona
 Teatro Donizetti, Bergamo
 Teatro La Fenice, Venice
 Teatro Lirico, Milan
 Teatro Lirico, Cagliari
 Teatro Filarmonico, Verona
 Teatro Francesco Cilea, Reggio Calabria
 Teatro Fraschini, Pavia
 Teatro Giuseppe Verdi, Busseto
 Teatro Grande, Brescia
 Teatro Lirico, Milan
 Teatro Lirico, Cagliari
 Teatro Lirico Giuseppe Verdi, Trieste
 Teatro Malibran, Venice
 Teatro Marrucino, Chieti
 Teatro Massimo, Palermo
 Teatro Massimo Bellini, Catania
 Teatro Mario Del Monaco, Treviso
 Teatro Mercadante, Naples
 Teatro Morlacchi, Perugia
 Teatro Municipale, Piacenza
 Teatro Municipale Valli, Reggio Emilia
 Teatro Municipale Giuseppe Verdi, Salerno
 Teatro Petruzzelli, Bari
 Teatro Piccinni, Bari
 Teatro Politeama, Catanzaro
 Teatro Politeama, Lecce
 Teatro Politeama Garibaldi, Palermo
 Teatro Regio Ducale, Milan (burned down in 1776; replaced by Teatro alla Scala)
 Teatro Regio di Parma, Parma
 Teatro Regio Torino, Turin
 Teatro Rossini, Lugo
 Teatro Rossini, Pesaro
 Teatro San Carlo, Naples
 Teatro Sannazzaro, Naples
 Teatro Sociale, Como
 Teatro Sociale di Mantova, Mantua
 Teatro Verdi, Padua
 Teatro Verdi, Pisa

Latvia 

 Latvian National Opera (LNO, Latvijas Nacionālā Opera), Riga

Lithuania 
 Lithuanian National Opera and Ballet Theatre (Lietuvos nacionalinis operos ir baleto teatras), Vilnius
 Kaunas State Musical Theatre (Kauno valstybinis muzikinis teatras), Kaunas
 Klaipeda State Musical Theatre (Klaipėdos valstybinis muzikinis teatras), Klaipėda

Malta 

 Aurora Opera House, Victoria, Gozo
 Manoel Theatre, Valletta
 Royal Opera House, Valletta (destroyed)

Moldova 
 National Opera and Ballet Theatre, Chișinău

Monaco 

 Opéra de Monte-Carlo, Monte-Carlo, Monaco

Netherlands 
 Dutch National Opera & Ballet, Amsterdam

North Macedonia 
 National Opera and Ballet

Norway 

 Den Norske Opera (Norwegian National Opera), Oslo
 Operaen i Kristiansund
 Operahuset Nordfjord

Poland 

 Baltic State Opera, Gdańsk
 Teatr Muzyczny w Gdyni, Gdynia
 Court Opera in Łazienki complex, Warsaw
 Forest Opera, Sopot
 Grand Theatre, Łódź
 Great Theatre, Poznań, Poznań
 Kraków Chamber Opera, Kraków
 Opera in the castle, Szczecin
 Opera Krakowska, Kraków
 Opera Nova, Bydgoszcz
 Opera Podlaska, Białystok
 Polish National Opera (Great Theatre), Warsaw
 Silesian Opera, Bytom
 Teatr Muzyczny w Lublinie, Lublin
 Warsaw Chamber Opera, Warsaw
 Wrocław Opera, Wrocław

Portugal 

 Casa da Música, Porto
 Teatro Nacional de São Carlos, Lisbon

Romania 

 Brașov Opera, Brașov
 Cluj Hungarian Opera, Cluj-Napoca
 Comic Opera House for Children, Bucharest
 Craiova Romanian Opera, Craiova
 Ion Dacian National Operetta Theatre, Bucharest
 Nae Leonard National Opera and Operetta Theatre, Galați
 Oleg Danovski National Opera and Ballet Theatre, Constanța
 Romanian National Opera, Bucharest
 Romanian National Opera, Cluj-Napoca
 Romanian National Opera, Iași
 Romanian National Opera, Timișoara

Russia 

 Astrakhan State Theatre of Opera and Ballet, Astrakhan
 Bashkir State Opera and Ballet Theatre, Ufa
 Bolshoi Theatre, Moscow
 Buryat Academic Opera and Ballet Theatre, Ulan-Ude
 The Chelyabinsk state academic opera and ballet theatre of M.I.Glinka, Chelyabinsk
 Chuvash State Opera and Ballet Theater, Cheboksary
 Ekaterinburg Opera and Ballet Theatre, Ekaterinburg
 Galina Vishnevskaya Opera Centre, Moscow
 Helikon Opera, Moscow
 Krasnoyarsk Opera and Ballet Theatre, Krasnoyarsk
 Magnitogorsk Opera and Ballet Theatre, Magnitogorsk
 Mariinsky Theatre, Saint Petersburg
 Mikhaylovsky Theatre, Saint Petersburg
 Moscow Operette Thearte, Moscow
 Musa Calil Tatar State Academic Opera and Ballet Theatre, Kazan
 Natalya Sats Musical Theater, Moscow
 Novaya Opera Theatre, Moscow
 Novosibirsk Opera and Ballet Theatre, Novosibirsk
 Pokrovsky Moscow State Academic Chamber Musical Theatre, Moscow
 Pushkin Nizhny Novgorod State Academic Opera and Ballet Theatre, Nizhny Novgorod
 Pyotr Illytch Tchaikovsky Perm Academic Opera and Ballet Theatre, Perm
 Republic Sakha – Yakutia State Academic Opera and Ballet Theatre, Yakutsk
 Rostov State Opera and Ballet, Rostov
 Samara State Academic Opera and Ballet Theatre, Samara
 Sapaev Mari State Opera and Ballet Theatre, Yoshkar-Ola
 Saratov Opera and Ballet Theater, Saratov
 St Petersburg Chamber Opera, Saint Petersburg
 Stanislavsky and Nemirovich-Danchenko Moscow Musical Academic Theatre, Moscow
 State Theatre of Opera and Ballet of Udmurt Republic, Izhevsk
 Taganrog Theatre, Taganrog
 Tsaritsynskaya opera, Volgograd
 Voronezh State Academic Opera and Ballet Theatre, Voronezh
 Zazerkalie, Saint Petersburg

Serbia 

 Madlenianum Opera and Theatre, Belgrade
 National Theatre in Belgrade, Belgrade
 Serbian National Theatre, Novi Sad

Slovakia 

 Slovak National Theatre, Bratislava
 State Opera in Banská Bystrica, Banská Bystrica
 State Theatre Košice, Košice

Slovenia 

 Ljubljana Opera House, Ljubljana 
 SNG Opera balet Maribor, Maribor

Spain 

 Euskalduna Conference Centre and Concert Hall, Bilbao
 Gran Teatre del Liceu, Barcelona
 Kursaal Palace, San Sebastián
 Mozart Hall, Zaragoza
 Palacio de la Ópera, A Coruña
 Palau de les Arts Reina Sofía, Valencia
 Teatro Arriaga, Bilbao
 Teatro Campoamor, Oviedo
 Teatro de la Maestranza, Seville
 Teatro de la Zarzuela, Madrid
 Teatre La Faràndula, Sabadell
 Teatre Principal, Barcelona (now closed)
 Teatre Principal de Maó, Mahón
 Teatro Real, Madrid
 Teatro Pérez Galdós, Las Palmas de Gran Canaria

Sweden 

 Drottningholm Palace Theatre (Drottningholms Slottsteater), Drottningholm
 Folkoperan, Stockholm
 Gothenburg Opera (GöteborgsOperan), Gothenburg
 Läckö Castle Opera, Lidköping
 Malmö Opera (Malmö Opera), Malmö
 Norrland Opera, Umeå
 Royal Swedish Opera (Kungliga Operan), Stockholm

Switzerland 

 Bühnen Bern (Stadttheater Bern), Bern
 Grand Théâtre de Genève, Geneva
 Lausanne Opera, Lausanne
 Opernhaus Zürich, Zürich
 Luzerner Theater (Stadttheater Luzern), Lucerne
 Theater Basel, Basel
 Theater Biel-Solothurn, Biel/Bienne–Solothurn
 Theater St. Gallen, St. Gallen

Ukraine 

 Chernivtsi Opera House, Chernivtsi
 Dnipropetrovsk Opera, Dnipropetrovsk
 Donetsk Opera, Donetsk
 Kharkiv Opera, Kharkiv
 National Opera of Ukraine, Kyiv
 Lviv Theatre of Opera and Ballet (Lviv National Academic Theatre of Opera and Ballet), Lviv
 October Palace, Kyiv
 Odessa Opera and Ballet Theater, Odessa

United Kingdom and Dependencies

England 

 Opera House, Buxton
 Coliseum Theatre, London
 Garsington Opera, Buckinghamshire
 Glyndebourne, East Sussex
 Grand Opera House, York
 Grange Park Opera, Horsley, Surrey
 Lowry Centre, Salford
 Opera House, Manchester
 Opera House, Tunbridge Wells
 Royal Opera House, Covent Garden, London
 Sadler's Wells (Sadler's Wells Theatre), London
 Tyne Theatre & Opera House, Newcastle upon Tyne
 Wakefield Opera House (became cinema 1920s), Wakefield

Northern Ireland 
 Grand Opera House, Belfast

Scotland 

 Edinburgh Festival Theatre (Festival Theatre), Edinburgh
 Music Hall & Opera House (remodelled 1889 as Assembly Rooms), Dundee
 Theatre Royal, Glasgow (Scottish Opera), Glasgow

Wales 
 Canolfan Mileniwm Cymru (Wales Millennium Centre), Cardiff
 Craig-y-Nos Castle, Powys, Wales

Isle of Man 
 Gaiety Theatre and Opera House, Douglas

Jersey 
 Jersey Opera House, Saint Helier, Jersey

North America

Canada 

 Dofasco Centre for the Performing Arts, Hamilton Opera, Hamilton, Ontario
 Elgin Theatre, Opera Atelier, Toronto, Ontario
 Four Seasons Centre for the Performing Arts (Canadian Opera Company), Toronto, Ontario
 Manitoba Centennial Concert Hall, Manitoba Opera, Winnipeg, Manitoba
 Northern Alberta Jubilee Auditorium (Edmonton Opera), Edmonton, Alberta
 Opera Lyra Ottawa, Ottawa, Ontario
 Queen Elizabeth Theatre (Vancouver Opera), Vancouver, British Columbia
 Royal Theatre, Pacific Opera Victoria, Victoria, British Columbia
 Salle Wilfrid-Pelletier, a theatre of the Place des Arts (Montréal Opera), Montréal, Quebec
 Southam Hall, National Arts Centre, Ottawa, Ontario
 Southern Alberta Jubilee Auditorium (Calgary Opera), Calgary, Alberta

Costa Rica 
 Teatro Nacional de Costa Rica, San José

Cuba 

 Gran Teatro de la Habana, Havana
 Teatro Sauto, Matanzas

Dominican Republic 

 Gran Teatro del Cibao, Santiago
 Teatro Nacional, Santo Domingo

El Salvador 
 Teatro Nacional de El Salvador, San Salvador

Mexico 

 Casa de la Ópera Angelopolitana, Puebla
 Palacio de Bellas Artes, Mexico City
 Teatro Aguascalientes, Aguascalientes
 Teatro Degollado, Guadalajara
 Teatro José Peón Contreras, Mérida

United States 

 Abraham Chavez Theatre (El Paso Opera), El Paso, Texas
 Academy of Music (Opera Company of Philadelphia), Philadelphia
 Bass Performance Hall (Fort Worth Opera), Fort Worth, Texas
 Benedum Center (Pittsburgh Opera), Pittsburgh, Pennsylvania
 Boston Opera House (1909), Boston
 Boston Opera House (1980), Boston
 Brown Theater, Wortham Theater Center (Houston Grand Opera), Houston
 California Theater (Opera San Jose), San Jose, California
 Carpenter Theater (Virginia Opera), Richmond, Virginia
 Central City Opera House (Central City Opera), Central City, Colorado
 Civic Opera House (Lyric Opera of Chicago), Chicago
 Civic Theatre Opera House (San Diego Opera), San Diego
 Clowes Memorial Hall (Indianapolis Opera), Indianapolis
 Cobb Energy Performing Arts Centre, Atlanta
 Crosby Theatre (Santa Fe Opera), Santa Fe, New Mexico
 David H. Koch Theater (formerly New York State Theater; formerly New York City Opera venue), New York
 Detroit Opera House (Michigan Opera Theater), Detroit
 Dicapo Opera Theater (Dicapo Opera), New York City
 Dorothy Chandler Pavilion (Los Angeles Opera), Los Angeles,
 Duchamp Opera House (1830) (Le Petit Paris), St. Martinville, Louisiana
 Ellie Caulkins Opera House (Opera Colorado), Denver
 French Opera House, New Orleans, Louisiana
 Harrison Opera House (Virginia Opera), Norfolk, Virginia
 Howard Gilman Opera House, Brooklyn Academy of Music, Brooklyn, New York
 Howell Opera House, Howell, Michigan
 Jefferson Performing Arts Center (Jefferson Performing Arts Society), Metairie, Louisiana
 Kennedy Center for the Performing Arts Opera House (Washington National Opera), Washington, D.C.
 Kauffman Center for the Performing Arts (Lyric Opera of Kansas City), Kansas City, Missouri
 Lyric Opera House (Baltimore Opera), Baltimore
 Mahalia Jackson Theater of the Performing Arts (New Orleans Opera) New Orleans
 Marcus Center (Florentine Opera), Milwaukee
 McCaw Hall (Seattle Opera), Seattle
 Mercury Opera House, Rochester, New York
 Metropolitan Opera House (Metropolitan Opera), New York
 Moores Opera House (Moores School of Music, University of Houston), Houston
 Music Hall (Cincinnati Opera), Cincinnati
 New York State Theater (See David H. Koch Theater) (formerly New York City Opera), New York
 Newberry Opera House (South Carolina Opera and Asheville Lyric Opera), Newberry, South Carolina
 Peabody Opera House, in St. Louis
 Plaza Theatre, in El Paso, Texas
 Rapides Opera House, Alexandria, Louisiana
 Reynolds Hall, Las Vegas
 River Center Theater for Performing Arts (Opéra Louisiane), Baton Rouge, Louisiana
 RiverView Theater (Shreveport Opera), Shreveport, Louisiana
 Sarasota Opera House (Sarasota Opera), Sarasota, Florida
 Segerstrom Hall (Opera Pacific), Costa Mesa, California
 Springer Opera House in Columbus, Georgia
 Theatre de la Renaissance, New Orleans
 Theatre de la Rue Saint Pierre, New Orleans
 Théâtre d'Orléans, New Orleans
 War Memorial Opera House (San Francisco Opera), San Francisco
 Winspear Opera House (Dallas Opera), Dallas,
 Ziff Ballet Opera House, Miami

Oceania

Australia 

 Adelaide Festival Centre, Adelaide
 Canberra Theatre, Canberra
 His Majesty's Theatre, Western Australia, Perth
 Lyric Theatre, Queensland Performing Arts Centre, Brisbane
 State Theatre, Arts Centre Melbourne (also known as the Victorian Arts Centre), Melbourne
 Sydney Opera House, Sydney
 Theatre Royal, Hobart, Tasmania

New Zealand 

 Kiri Te Kanawa Theatre in the Aotea Centre, Auckland, one of the venues of Auckland Live
 Oamaru Opera House, Oamaru
 Opera House, Wellington
 St. James Theatre, Wellington

South America

Argentina 

 Independencia Theater, Mendoza
 Teatro Libertador General San Martín, Córdoba
 Municipal Theater of Santa Fe, Santa Fe
 Teatro Alberdi, San Miguel de Tucumán
 Teatro Argentino de La Plata, La Plata
 Teatro Avenida, Buenos Aires
 Teatro El Circulo, Rosario
 Teatro Colón, Buenos Aires
 Teatro San Martin, San Miguel de Tucumán

Bolivia 

 Casa Teatro, Santa Cruz
 Teatro René Moreno, Santa Cruz

Brazil 

 Teatro Amazonas, Manaus
 Teatro Arthur Azevedo, São Luís
 Theatro da Paz, Belém
 Teatro José de Alencar, Fortaleza
 Teatro Municipal (Municipal Theatre), Rio de Janeiro
 Teatro Coliseu, Santos
 Teatro Guarany, Santos
 Teatro Municipal (Municipal Theatre), São João da Boa Vista
 Teatro Municipal (Municipal Theatre), São Paulo
 Teatro Pedro II, Ribeirão Preto
 Teatro São Pedro, Porto Alegre
 Theatro São Pedro, São Paulo
 Teatro Santa Isabel, Recife
 Wire Opera House, Curitiba

 Theatro Municipal de Niterói, Niterói
 Palácio das Artes, Belo Horizonte
Cine-Theatro Central, Juiz de Fora
Teatro Carlos Gomes, Vitória
Teatro Municipal Casa da Ópera, Ouro Preto
Teatro Deodoro, Maceió
Teatro Alberto Maranhão, Natal
Teatro Tobias Barreto, Aracaju
Teatro Guaíra, Curitiba
Theatro Sete de Abril, Pelotas
Teatro Esperança, Jaguarão
Theatro Guarany, Pelotas
Teatro Santa Roza, João Pessoa
Teatro Renault, São Paulo
Teatro Nacional Cláudio Santoro, Brasília
Teatro Sete de Setembro, Penedo
Teatro Goiânia, Goiânia
Teatro Polytheama, Jundiaí
 Teatro Álvaro de Carvalho, Florianópolis 
 Teatro Castro Alves, Salvador

Chile 
 Teatro Municipal, Santiago

Colombia 

 Medellín Metropolitan Theatre, Medellín
 Teatro de Cristobal Colón, Bogotá
 Teatro Heredia Adolfo Mejía, Cartagena
 Teatro Jorge Isaacs, Santiago de Cali
 Teatro Mayor Julio Mario Santo Domingo, Bogotá
 Teatro Municipal, Santiago de Cali

Peru 
 Teatro Manuel Ascencio Segura, Lima

Uruguay 

 Auditorio Nacional Adela Reta, Montevideo
 Teatro Solís, Montevideo

Venezuela 

 Teresa Carreño Cultural Complex, Caracas
 Teresa de La Opera, Maracay
 Teresa Municipal, Caracas
 Teatro Municipal, Valencia

See also 

 List of buildings
 List of concert halls
 List of contemporary amphitheatres
 List of jazz clubs
 Operabase, a database of opera information
 Opera house
 Theatre

References 
Notes

Sources
 Allison, John (ed.), Great Opera Houses of the World, supplement to Opera magazine, London 2003
 Beauvert, Thierry, Opera Houses of the World, The Vendôme Press, New York, 1995. 
 Lynn, Karyl Charna, Opera: the Guide to Western Europe's Great Houses, Santa Fe, New Mexico: John Muir Publications, 1991. 
 Lynn, Karyl Charna, Italian Opera Houses and Festivals, Lanham, Maryland: The Scarecrow Press, Inc., 2005. 
 Plantamura, Carol, The Opera Lover's Guide to Europe, Citadel Press, 1996, 

 
Houses
 
Lists of theatres
Lists of music venues